is a railway station in the city of Iiyama, Nagano Prefecture, Japan operated by East Japan Railway Company (JR East). In older station photos, its name is hyphenated "Kami-Sakai".

Lines
Kamisakai Station is served by the Iiyama Line, and is 31.3 kilometers from the starting point of the line at Toyono Station.

Station layout
The station consists of one side platform serving one bi-directional track. The station is unattended.

History
It was renamed to its present name with the nationalisation of the Iiyama line on 1 June 1944. With the privatization of Japanese National Railways (JNR) on 1 April 1987, the station came under the control of JR East. A new station building was completed in December 2006.

Surrounding area
Chikuma River

See also
 List of railway stations in Japan

References

External links

 JR East station information 

Railway stations in Nagano Prefecture
Iiyama Line
Railway stations in Japan opened in 1923
Iiyama, Nagano